Inner Carniola is a traditional region of Slovenia, the southwestern part of the larger Carniola region. It comprises the Hrušica karst plateau up to Postojna Gate, bordering the Slovenian Littoral (the Gorizia region) in the west. Its administrative and economic center of the region is Postojna, and other minor centers include Vrhnika, Logatec, Cerknica, Pivka, and Ilirska Bistrica.

Name
The English name Inner Carniola, like the Slovene name Notranjska, is a translation of German Innerkrain, referring to the southwest part of Carniola. The name was created by analogy with Inner Austria, referring to the southwestern Habsburg hereditary lands.

History

Inner Carniola was a kreis of the Duchy of Carniola, ruled by the archducal House of Habsburg within the Inner Austrian lands starting in the 14th century. The territorial arrangement was described by the scholar Johann Weikhard von Valvasor (1641–1693) in his 1689 work The Glory of the Duchy of Carniola. Part of the Napoleonic Illyrian Provinces from 1809, Carniola returned to the Austrian Empire by the 1814 Treaty of Paris. First administrated within the Austrian Kingdom of Illyria, the Carniolan duchy again became a Habsburg crown land from 1849 till 1919.

Part of Italy

After World War I, the western part of the region was occupied by the Italian military. In 1920, the Treaty of Rapallo transferred the western part of the region (with around two-thirds of the population) to the Kingdom of Italy. The eastern third was included into the Kingdom of Serbs, Croats and Slovenes (later renamed Yugoslavia).

Italy was given the districts of Vipava, Postojna, Ilirska Bistrica, Senožeče, and Idrija. The region was divided among the provinces of Gorizia, Trieste, and Fiume (Rijeka). With the rise of Fascism, it was subjected to a policy of violent Italianization until the downfall of Fascism in Italy. In 1947, it was transferred to Yugoslavia, which had occupied it since 1945.

Images

References 

 
Historical regions in Slovenia
Subdivisions of Carniola